Jacques Billant (born 20 January 1960 in Auch, France) is a French senior civil servant and current Prefect of Réunion.

Jacques Billant graduated from the Special Military School of Saint-Cyr in 1983 In 2015, the Council of Ministers, appointed Billant as the Prefect of Guadeloupe and representative of the State in the communities of Saint-Barthélemy and Saint-Martin. He remained in post until his appointment as head of the Prefecture of Puy-de-Dôme on 4 September 2017. In December 2018, Billant joined the Ministry of Agriculture as Director of the Cabinet to Minister Didier Guillaume.

On 17 June 2019, Billant became the Prefect of Réunion. Prefects not only represent the State, but also handle the non-military aspects of crises. Jacques Billant is therefore in charge of the management of the COVID-19 pandemic in Réunion.

References

1960 births
Prefects of Réunion
Prefects of Guadeloupe
French civil servants
French military officers
People from Auch
Living people